Yeniçay is a village in Tarsus district of Mersin Province, Turkey. It is situated in Çukurova (Cilicia of the antiquity) to the south of Tarsus and on the west bank of Berdan River. The population of Yeniçay was 142 as of 2012.

References

Villages in Tarsus District